Oliver "Oli" Wood  (born 26 November 1995) is a British cyclist, who currently rides for UCI Continental team . He has represented Great Britain at international competitions in track cycling winning bronze medals at the 2016 UEC European Track Championships in the team pursuit and at the 2018 UEC European Track Championships in the madison.

Major results

2014
 National Track Championships
1st  Team pursuit
1st  Scratch race
2015
 National Track Championships
1st  Team pursuit
1st  Points race
 2nd Six Days of London (with Chris Latham)
2016
 UCI Track World Cup
1st Team pursuit, Glasgow
3rd Madison (with Mark Stewart), Apeldoorn
3rd Team pursuit, Hong Kong
 3rd  Team pursuit, UEC European Championships
 7th Kattekoers
2017
 1st Team pursuit, UCI Track World Cup, Manchester
 1st Ryedale GP
 4th Road race, UCI Under-23 Road World Championships
2018
 1st  Scratch race, National Track Championships
 2nd  Team pursuit, Commonwealth Games
 2nd Team pursuit, UCI Track World Cup, Saint-Quentin-en-Yvelines
 3rd  Madison (with Ethan Hayter), UEC European Track Championships
2019
 1st Stage 1 Tour of the Reservoir
 1st Sheffield, National Circuit Series
 2nd  Team pursuit, UCI Track World Championships
 UEC European Track Championships
3rd  Team pursuit
3rd  Omnium
2020
 3rd  Scratch race, UEC European Track Championships
2021
 3rd  Team pursuit, UCI Track World Championships
2022
 UCI Track World Championships
1st  Team pursuit
2nd  Madison (with Ethan Hayter)
 2nd  Team pursuit, Commonwealth Games
2023
 UEC European Track Championships
1st  Scratch race
2nd  Team pursuit

References

External links

1995 births
Living people
British male cyclists
British track cyclists
Sportspeople from Wakefield
Commonwealth Games medallists in cycling
Commonwealth Games silver medallists for England
Cyclists at the 2018 Commonwealth Games
Olympic cyclists of Great Britain
Cyclists at the 2020 Summer Olympics
Cyclists at the 2022 Commonwealth Games
Commonwealth Games competitors for England
UCI Track Cycling World Champions (men)
21st-century British people
Medallists at the 2018 Commonwealth Games
Medallists at the 2022 Commonwealth Games